John Scholes may refer to:
John M. Scholes (1948–2019), computer scientist and APL implementer and programmer
John Scholes (cricketer) (1950–2003), Australian cricketer

See also
John Skoyles (disambiguation)